"Let's Get Started If We're Gonna Break My Heart" is a song written by Don Reid and Harold Reid, and recorded by American country music group The Statler Brothers.  It was released in October 1988 as the first single from their Greatest Hits compilation album.  The song reached #12 on the Billboard Hot Country Singles & Tracks chart.

Chart performance

References

Songs about heartache
1988 songs
The Statler Brothers songs
Songs written by Don Reid (singer)
Songs written by Harold Reid
Song recordings produced by Jerry Kennedy
Mercury Records singles
1988 singles